Thomas Plunkett Hayes  is a retired senior Australian public servant, best known for his time at the Australian Customs Service.

Life and career
Hayes was appointed to the position of Secretary of the Department of Business and Consumer Affairs starting in March 1982. He transitioned into a new position as head of the Department of Industry and Commerce in May 1982, which was described in media as "because of changes in administrative arrangements... mostly his old department". 

In 1984, the Department of Industry and Commerce was abolished, and replaced with the Department of Industry, Technology and Commerce, and Hayes moved into the new Department in the Secretary position. 

When the Australian Customs Service was established in 1985, splitting out from the Department of Industry, Technology and Commerce, Hayes was appointed its Comptroller-General. At the time, Hayes said the Customs service required the full-time attention of its top executive.

In 1988, Hayes left his position at the Australian Customs Service to take up the post of Secretary-General of the Customs Cooperation Council in Brussels (now known as the World Customs Organization).

Awards
Hayes was made an Officer of the Order of Australia in June 1992 for service to international organisations, and for his public service.

References

Living people
Year of birth missing (living people)
Place of birth missing (living people)
Australian public servants
Officers of the Order of Australia